The 2004 Ashdod Port bombings were two suicide bombings carried out nearly simultaneously on March 14, 2004 at the Port of Ashdod in Ashdod, Israel. 10 people were killed in the attack, and 16 were injured. Hamas and Fatah claimed joint responsibility for the attack.

The attack

On Sunday, March 14, 2004, two Palestinian suicide bombers who wore explosive belts hidden underneath their clothes approached the Port of Ashdod. Despite the vast security arrangements at the compound, the two suicide bombers managed to infiltrate into the compound.

At 16:20 pm the suicide bombers detonated their explosive devices - one exploded himself in an office building inside the compound, and the other exploded after a few moments at the entrance to the compound. The force of the blast killed ten civilians, most of them were port workers, and injured 16 others.

The perpetrators and Israeli response 
Hamas and Fatah claimed joint responsibility for the attack and stated that the attack was carried out by two 18-year-olds from the Jabalya refugee camp in the Gaza Strip. The two assailants managed to infiltrate Israel from Gaza by hiding in a container that went through the Karni Crossing. A Hamas leader in Gaza stated that the original plan was that the suicide bombers would blow up fuel tanks at the port; Israel said the bombers intended to carry out a "mega attack" with hundreds of casualties, but instead blew themselves up hundreds of meters from the tanks. Later on it was revealed that the attack was financed and directed by Nizar Rayan. In response, Hamas founder Ahmed Yassin was killed along with his bodyguards in a strike by Israeli helicopters in Gaza City.

See also
Pi Glilot bombing
Israeli casualties of war

References

External links
 Suicide blasts kill 11 Israelis - published on BBC News on March 14, 2004
 Bomb fiends kill 11 - Israel cancels this week's summit - published on New York Post on March 15, 2004
 Suicide bombers kill 10 at Israeli port - published on The Guardian on March 15, 2004
 Suicide Bombers Kill 10 in Israel, And Derail Prime Ministers' Talks - published on The New York Times on March 15, 2004

Mass murder in 2004
Suicide bombings in 2004
2004 Ashdod Port bombings
Hamas suicide bombings
Terrorist incidents in Israel in 2004
Al-Qassam Brigades Operations
March 2004 events in Asia
Islamic terrorist incidents in 2004
Islamic terrorism in Israel